Nacha, originally the National Automated Clearinghouse Association, manages the development, administration, and governance of the ACH Network, the backbone for the electronic movement of money and data in the United States, and is an association for the payments industry. The ACH Network serves as a network for direct consumer, business, and government payments, and annually facilitates billions of payments such as Direct Deposit and Direct Payment. The ACH Network is governed by the Nacha Operating Rules, a set of rules that guide risk management.

Nacha is a 501(c)(6) not-for-profit association incorporated in 1974. It represents more than 9,000 financial institutions by way of ten regional payments associations and direct membership. Nacha is not directly involved in the ACH transactions that flow to and from organizations and financial institutions, but develops rules and standards, provides industry solutions, and delivers education, accreditation, and advisory services.

History and organization 
In 1972, the California Automated Clearing House Association (now called WesPay) was formed, becoming the first operational ACH association in the United States.

After two years, other regional ACH associations were formed. The associations came together in 1974 to create Nacha, which was tasked with developing, governing and administering the ACH Network. While Nacha governs the ACH Network, it does not operate the physical ACH Network; the processing of transactions is handled by the Federal Reserve and The Clearing House (also known as EPN).

Originally part of the American Bankers Association, Nacha separated in 1985 and hired Bill Moroney as its first CEO. He was succeeded in 1988 by Elliott McEntee. Upon McEntee's retirement in 2008, Janet O. Estep became Nacha's President and CEO. In 2019, Jane Larimer became Nacha's President and CEO.

Leadership 
Nacha’s Board of Directors are representatives of depository financial institutions who are tasked with overseeing the governance and administration of Nacha as ACH Network administrator and industry association.

The 2022 Board of Directors:

 Joe W. Hussey, Managing Director, North America Payables & Receivables Product Executive, J.P. Morgan Chase & Co., Chairperson
 Laura J. Listwan, AAP, CTP, Senior Vice President, Head of Commercial Payments Products and Service, Fifth Third Bank, Vice Chairperson
 John E. Lucas, CCM, Treasury & Payments Solutions Director of Product Management and Development, Synovus Financial Corporation, Secretary/Treasurer
 Jane Larimer, President & Chief Executive Officer, Nacha
 Jeanine M. Andol-Moeller, CCM, Group Vice President & Banking Services COE Manager, M&T Bank (one-year term)
 Marlene Barkheimer, President & Chief Executive Officer, Farmers State Bank
 Sarah T. Billings, Senior Vice President, Head of Payments Product, Operations & Strategy, Treasury Management, PNC Bank
 Lisa S. Coffey, Chief Innovation Officer, Corporate America Credit Union
 Elizabeth A. Cronenweth, AAP, CCM, Senior Vice President, Payments Group Product Manager, UMB Bank, N.A.
 Nicholas J. Drinkwine, APRP, Head of Transaction Operations, Varo Bank, N.A.
 Vikram Israni, Chief Financial Officer, Wings Financial Credit Union
 Tina M. Knapp, CPA, Vice President & Director, Payments & Service Support, ESL Federal Credit Union
 Stephen C. Max, Executive Vice President, Head of Operations Services, U.S. Bank
 AJ McCray, Managing Director, Head of Global Corporate Payments, Bank of America, N.A.
 Tim Mills, Senior Vice President, Emerging Payments, Regions Bank
 Philip C. Picillo, Esq., CTP, Senior Vice President, Treasury & Payment Solutions, Webster Bank
 Christopher E. Richards, APRP, Executive Vice President, Chief Banking Services Officer, The Cape Cod Five Cents Savings Bank
 William J. Schoch, President & Chief Executive Officer, Wespay
 Carl Slabicki, AAP, CTP, Managing Director, Treasury Services, BNY Mellon
 Michelle E. Ziolkowski, CTP, Senior Vice President, Head of Global Payables, Wells Fargo

The ACH Operator Advisor Representatives to the Board:

 Jason Carone, AAP, APRP, CTP, Senior Vice President, ACH Product Management, The Clearing House
 Keith Melton, Head of Product & Strategy Management, Retail Payments Office, Federal Reserve Bank of Atlanta

Initiatives

ACH payments 
The ACH Network processes payments. ACH payments can be sent as either “same-day,” “next-day,” or “2-day” – and Same Day ACH payments can be initiated and completed within a single day and as fast as a matter of hours.

Direct deposit 
Nacha's establishment led to the first ACH rules being drafted, and that in turn paved the way for the very first type of ACH transactions, known as Direct Deposit. The U.S. Air Force became the first employer in the nation to initiate a Direct Deposit payroll program. Direct Deposit is the way nearly 94 percent of Americans get paid.

COVID-19 Economic Impact Payments 
In March 2020, the Coronavirus Aid, Relief, and Economic Security Act provided EIP or Economic Impact Payments up to $1,200 per adult and $500 per child. The federal government sent hundreds of millions of economic impact payments (EIPs) by Direct Deposit to Americans financially impacted by the Covid-19 crisis.

Quest rules for EBT
Nacha wrote and administers the Quest Operating Rules for Electronic Benefits Transfer (EBT) which have been in place since 1996. The Quest Operating Rules for Electronic Benefits Transfer (EBT) enable the distribution of government benefits regardless of state borders. Government entities incorporate the rules in their contracts with private sector service providers. Nacha administers the Quest Operating Rules and works with all interested parties to develop additional standards for related programs.

Standards for ACA payments
Under the administrative simplification provisions of the Affordable Care Act, Nacha was designated by the United States Department of Health & Human Services as the standards development organization (SDO) for healthcare Electronic Funds Transfer (EFT). The Healthcare Electronic Funds Transfer (EFT) standard supports electronic claim payments and remittance information between health plans and health care providers, accelerating cash flow and simplifying reconciliation for providers. Nacha's CCD+Addenda payment (a business-to-business payment with one addenda record of remittance information) is the standard for healthcare EFT transactions. Under the ACA's administrative simplification framework, health plans are required to pay claims using the standard EFT transaction, whenever requested by healthcare, medical or dental practices. In 2018, more than 306.7 million ACH EFT payments, valued at $1.59 trillion, were made from health plans to healthcare providers. In the second quarter of 2021, health processed 108 million EFTs, up almost 36% from the same 2020 period. Today, 84% of providers prefer EFT from payers.

Phixius
On 12 August 2020,  Nacha reported that Visa has entered a growing list of collaborators piloting Phixius. Phixius is a Nacha-built and managed business that uses technologies, structured APIs and rules to allow interoperability in a secure network of linked credentialed service providers (CSPs) for the protected exchange of payment related details. In 2022, Phixius forecasts 1 million transactions, reaching more than 1,700 financial institutions and 7,000 businesses.

Membership 
Nacha has more than 500 members, and offers the following membership categories.

Nacha Direct Member

Nacha Direct Members are Financial Institutions and Payments Associations, and are active participants in educating and advocating for the ACH Network with regulators, legislators, and other stakeholder organizations whose policies affect the payments system. As Direct Members, these entities vote on amendments to the Nacha Operating Rules.

Payments Innovation Alliance

The Payments Innovation Alliance is a membership group of domestic and international organizations who develop new ideas and initiatives to advance the electronic payments industry.

Nacha Affiliate Program

The Affiliate Program is an information-only membership option that gives access to resources on the ACH Network and the Nacha Operating Rules.

Afinis Interoperability Standards

Afinis develops implementable, interoperable, and portable financial services standards (Application Programming Interfaces – APIs) across operating environments and platforms.

Education 
Nacha provides educational programs to its members and the financial services industry. These programs include:

Smarter Faster Payments Conference

Smarter Faster Payments is an annual conference for the financial industry, which includes an exhibit hall, education events and networking opportunities. Payments Remote Connect is the virtual option for those who are unable to attend the conference in person.

Payments Institute

The Payments Institute is an in-person academic program where students build their own curriculum from five schools of study, two master’s programs, and lecture halls. TPI Homeschool is a virtual option for the Payments Institute.

SPEAK (Strengthening Payments Engagement and Knowledge)

SPEAK is a subscription-based education platform offering on-demand, virtual payments education content.

ACH Legal and Compliance Summit

ACH Legal and Compliance Summit is a program founded in 2021. The Summit serves to provide attendees with the knowledge necessary in ACH compliance and regulations in the payments industry to protect clients and organizations.

Accreditation 
Nacha offers accreditation programs for financial industry professionals and organizations, including the Accredited ACH Professional (AAP) and the Accredited Payments Risk Professional (APRP) accreditations.

Accredited ACH Professional

The Accredited ACH Professional (AAP) is a professional certification designating that an individual has demonstrated a comprehensive knowledge of all areas of ACH, a deep understanding of and experience in one or more specific ACH subjects, and a broad knowledge of concepts that relate to the payments system.

Accredited Payments Risk Professional

The Accredited Payments Risk Professional (APRP) is a professional certification designating that an individual has demonstrated a comprehensive knowledge of risk management strategies, concepts, and mitigation techniques within the payments ecosystem, while mastering the complexities of risk management for ACH, check, wire, debit, credit, and prepaid cards, and emerging and alternative payments.

Acquisitions and partnerships 
In March 2018, Nacha acquired the Interactive Financial eXchange (IFX) Forum. In September 2018, Nacha launched Afinis Interoperability Standards, a membership-based standards organization, to develop interoperable, portable financial services standards. IFX Forum is a part of Afinis Interoperability Standards.

Nacha announced it had acquired the Business Payments Directory Association in October 2018. BPD supports business-to-business (B2B) payment services, including blockchain-based B2B transactions.

See also 
 ACH Network
 Automated Clearing House
 Electronic funds transfer
 National Automated Clearing House

References

External links 
 
 Nacha Operating Rules

Financial services companies of the United States
Payment clearing systems